Stargroth Amean (born 1991) is a Papua New Guinean professional rugby league footballer who plays for the Port Moresby Vipers. He was unable to return to the UK citing family reasons to play for Barrow Raiders in 2020 but remained under contract. He was part of the PNG Hunters team in 2017 which won the Queensland Cup.

Stargroth's last match for PNG Hunters was on 1 April 2018 against Tweed Heads Seagulls in front of his home crowd in Port Moresby. Amean quit the Hunters to start his foundation year of the Bachelor of Science programme at the University of Papua New Guinea in 2018.

Early life 
Amean was born in Wabag, Enga Province in Papua New Guinea. He played his junior rugby league for the Paga Panthers. He claims to be named after a Spanish actor.

Playing career 
Amean was signed by the Hela Wigmen in PNG's domestic competition for the 2011 season. He joined the Port Moresby Vipers the following year, but injuries to both legs meant he couldn't take the field between late 2012 and mid-2014. His form with the Vipers saw him join the Hunters in the Queensland Cup.

In 2019 Amean signed for the Barrow Raiders playing mainly as a centre. Following the 2019 season Amean signed a 2 year contract extension with the Raiders, unfortunately due to personal circumstances he was unable to return and resigned with the Port Moresby Vipers.

References

External links
2017 RLWC profile

1991 births
Living people
Barrow Raiders players
Papua New Guinea Hunters players
Papua New Guinea national rugby league team players
Papua New Guinean rugby league players
People from Enga Province
Rugby league fullbacks